The Sulphite Railroad Bridge, also known locally as the Upside-Down Covered Bridge is a historic railroad bridge in Franklin, New Hampshire. The bridge was built circa 1896-7 to carry the tracks of the Boston and Maine Railroad across the Winnipesaukee River between Franklin and Tilton. The bridge is believed to be the only surviving "upside down" covered railroad bridge in the United States, in which the rail bed is laid  on top of the bridge roof, whose purpose is to shelter the trusses below. The bridge was listed on the National Register of Historic Places in 1975. The bridge, unused since 1973, is not in good condition, having been subjected to graffiti, vandalism, and arson, as well as the elements.

Description and history
The main central span measures .

The bridge was built about 1896-7 by the Boston and Maine Railroad, replacing a standard trestle bridge built in 1892 by the Franklin and Tilton Railroad. The bridge acquired its name for the large amount of sulfite carried by the rail line to paper mills in Franklin. The mills, which were the principal users of the line, closed in the 1920s, and another covered bridge on the line, crossing the Merrimack River, was washed away by flooding in 1936. The railroad line was shut down entirely in 1973. The bridge is believed to be the only surviving "upside down" covered railroad bridge, in which the rail bed is laid on top of the bridge roof, whose purpose is to shelter the trusses below.

See also

List of bridges documented by the Historic American Engineering Record in New Hampshire
List of bridges on the National Register of Historic Places in New Hampshire
List of New Hampshire covered bridges
National Register of Historic Places listings in Merrimack County, New Hampshire

References

External links

New Hampshire DHR page on the bridge

Covered bridges on the National Register of Historic Places in New Hampshire
Bridges completed in 1897
Buildings and structures in Merrimack County, New Hampshire
Franklin, New Hampshire
Historic American Engineering Record in New Hampshire
National Register of Historic Places in Merrimack County, New Hampshire
Railroad bridges on the National Register of Historic Places in New Hampshire
Wooden bridges in New Hampshire
Pratt truss bridges in the United States
Covered bridges in the United States destroyed by arson